is a Ryukyuan gusuku located in Nakijin, Okinawa. It is currently in ruins. In the late 14th century, the island of Okinawa consisted of three principalities: Nanzan to the south, Chūzan in the central area, and Hokuzan in the north. Nakijin was the capital of Hokuzan. The fortress includes several sacred Utaki groves, reflecting the castle's role as a center of religious activity. It is today known for the Hikan cherries which bloom in northern Okinawa between mid-January and early February, providing the first cherry blossoms each year in Japan. In 2000, Nakijin Castle was designated as a World Heritage Site, as a part of the Gusuku Sites and Related Properties of the Kingdom of Ryukyu.

History
Though there had been Lords of Nakijin prior to the creation of the Hokuzan kingdom, and thus some form of chiefly residence can be presumed to have been on or near the site before, it is believed that the gusuku form of Nakijin castle only emerged at the founding of the kingdom. It is located on the Motobu Peninsula, on a rocky outcropping, facing out over the East China Sea.

The castle is separated from the main mountain mass of Motobu on the east by a steep drop into a gorge with a stream at the bottom. A steep drop to the north and northeast from the castle drops down to the shoreline. A small harbor inlet here once served the castle, while Unten harbor, the main port of the Hokuzan kingdom, lay roughly 5 to 6 miles to the east.

The royal residence was located at the highest and innermost part of the complex and was surrounded by a small garden with a spring. Three shrines (uganju) stood at the highest point of the precipice. In a less inner enclosures, located at a somewhat lower elevations, were residences for certain vassals, along with administrative buildings, stables for the horses, and garrisons for the warriors of the principality. As was typical of gusuku construction at this time, the stonework of the walls was very solid, but quite rough, with a relative lack of precision fitting or fine cutting. Roughly 1500 meters of limestone castle wall remain today.

The castle saw three generations of rulers before being attacked and destroyed by the armies of Chūzan in 1416. Lords of Hokuzan governing in subordination to the royal capital at Shuri would continue to make their residence here for several centuries afterwards.

In 1609, the Japanese feudal Domain of Satsuma invaded the Ryukyu Kingdom. After fierce fighting in the Amami Islands, they landed on Okinawa Island at Unten harbor. They attacked Nakijin Castle with heavy casualties on both sides, but the Japanese prevailed and burned the castle.

As a tourist site, the ruins are particularly known for the beautiful view out over the East China Sea, for the impressive grandeur of the castle walls, and for the overall amount of space taken up by the castle grounds. Hokuzan in general was characterized by wider spaces, or at least less dense settlement and population, than Nanzan and Chūzan, the other kingdoms on the island at that time. Nakijin is also consistently among the first places in the country to see, and celebrate, the blooming of the cherry blossoms (sakura) each year.

References

Sources

External links 

 Wonder Okinawa: Nakijin Castle[Retrieved]
 http://english.ryukyushimpo.jp/2018/07/13/29017/
 
 Nakijin Gusuku

World Heritage Sites in Japan
Former castles in Japan
Castles in Okinawa Prefecture
Historic Sites of Japan